Shabu (also Romanized as Shabū; also known as Kalāt-e Shab, Kalateh Shab, and Kalāteh-ye Shab) is a village in Doreh Rural District, in the Central District of Sarbisheh County, South Khorasan Province, Iran. At the 2006 census, its population was 90, in 19 families.

References 

Populated places in Sarbisheh County